David Raih (born September 9, 1980) is an American football coach. He most recently served as offensive coordinator and wide receivers coach at Vanderbilt University. Prior to Vanderbilt, Raih was the wide receivers coach for the Arizona Cardinals from 2019 to 2020 and for the Green Bay Packers in 2018.

Early life
Born September 9, 1980, Raih attended Saint Thomas Academy in Mendota Heights, Minnesota, a Catholic, college-prep, military high school where he was promoted to lieutenant colonel, the second-highest-ranking officer in the high school. Raih was a three-sport athlete in football, basketball and track. In his junior year, his team won the Minnesota state basketball championship. He also quarterbacked his team to the Minnesota state semifinals in football in both his junior and senior years.
Raih played college football as a quarterback at the University of Iowa, earning a letter in his fourth year as the 2002 Iowa Hawkeyes football team won the Big Ten Conference title and earned a berth in the 2003 Orange Bowl. His playing career was limited due to injury.  He had surgery on his throwing arm in both 1999 and 2002.
Prior to his start coaching, Raih was a sales representative for Zimmer Inc., a manufacturer of orthopedic devices (2004–07).

Coaching career

UCLA
Raih's coaching career started at UCLA, where he spent two years as an intern (2008–09) working with the quarterbacks under head coach Rick Neuheisel. Raih left his six-figure salary job at Zimmer Inc. to become an unpaid intern for the UCLA.

Iowa
Raih spent three seasons as a graduate assistant coach at his alma mater, the University of Iowa, where he assisted with tight ends (2012) and the offensive line (2010–2011).

Texas Tech
In 2013 Raih joined Texas Tech as the director of high school relations, in addition to assisting with quarterbacks under head coach Kliff Kingsbury Raih was promoted to outside receivers coach going into the 2013 Holiday Bowl.

Green Bay Packers
Raih spent five seasons with the Packers, most recently working as the wide receivers coach after being promoted on January 24, 2018. He previously served as offensive perimeter coach, following a promotion on February 27, 2017, and was earlier named assistant offensive line coach on February 17, 2016. He was initially hired by Head Coach Mike McCarthy on February 7, 2014, and spent his first two years as the team’s coaching administrator.

Arizona Cardinals
On January 13, 2019, Raih was hired by the Arizona Cardinals as their wide receivers coach, reuniting with head coach Kliff Kingsbury.

Vanderbilt
On February 2, 2021 Raih was hired as the offensive coordinator and wide receivers coach at Vanderbilt University under head coach Clark Lea. He resigned after the season.

References

External links
 Arizona Cardinals bio

1980 births
Living people
American football quarterbacks
Arizona Cardinals coaches
Iowa Hawkeyes football coaches
Iowa Hawkeyes football players
Green Bay Packers coaches
Texas Tech Red Raiders football coaches
UCLA Bruins football coaches
Vanderbilt Commodores football coaches
Sportspeople from Edina, Minnesota
Players of American football from Minnesota